An inherent vowel is part of an abugida (or alphasyllabary) script. It is a vowel sound which is used with each unmarked or basic consonant symbol. For example, if the Latin alphabet used 'i' as an inherent vowel, "Wikipedia" could be rendered as "Wkpeda" [w(I)+k(I)+p+e+d(I)+a] .

There are many known abugida scripts, including most of the Brahmic scripts and Kharosthi, the cursive Meroitic script, which developed in Nubia (today in Southern Egypt and Northern Sudan), and the Ge'ez script. Many of them are still used today. Old Persian cuneiform also uses a device similar to an inherent vowel, though only with a subset of its consonants, so some authors do not consider it to be a true abugida. Although it is the earliest known script to use the inherent vowel principle (from the 6th century BC), no direct link among these four writing traditions has yet been demonstrated.

Most Brahmic scripts and Ge'ez scripts use the consonant characters as base graphemes, from which the syllables are built up. Base graphemes having a consonant with an inherent vowel can be usually changed to other graphemes by joining a tone mark or dependent vowel to the grapheme. Meroitic and Old Persian cuneiform instead mark syllables with non-inherent vowels by following the base character with a character representing one of the non-inherent vowels.

Writing systems with inherent vowels often use a special marking (a diacritic) to suppress the inherent vowel so that only a consonant is represented, such as the virama found in many South Asian scripts. Other systems rely on the reader's knowledge of the language to distinguish a consonant with the inherent vowel from a pure consonant (Hindi, Old Persian cuneiform) or to distinguish a particular vowel-marked form from a pure consonant (Ge'ez and related scripts).

References

Abugida writing systems
Vowels